A Temporary Gentleman is a 1920 British silent comedy film directed by Fred W. Durrant and starring Owen Nares,  Madge Titheradge and Alfred Drayton. It was shot at Isleworth Studios.

Plot
A clerk's service as subaltern spoils him for menial work.

Cast
 Owen Nares as Walter Hope  
 Madge Titheradge as Miss Hudson  
 Tom Reynolds as Mr. Jack  
 Maudie Dunham as Alice Hope  
 Sydney Fairbrother as Mrs. Hope  
 Alfred Drayton as Sir Herbert Hudson

References

Bibliography
 Harris, Ed. Britain's Forgotten Film Factory: The Story of Isleworth Studios. Amberley Publishing, 2012.

External links

1920 films
1920 comedy films
British comedy films
British silent feature films
Films set in England
Films shot at Isleworth Studios
British black-and-white films
1920s English-language films
1920s British films
Silent comedy films